Once Upon a Scoundrel is a 1974 American-Mexican comedy film directed by George Schaefer and starring Zero Mostel, Katy Jurado and A Martinez.

Plot

Cast
 Zero Mostel as Carlos del Refugio  
 Katy Jurado as Aunt Delfina  
 A Martinez as Luis Manuel  
 Pancho Córdova
 Priscilla Garcia as Alicia 
 Xavier Marc 
 Tamara Garina 
 Rita Macedo
 Abraham Stavans 
 José Chávez 
 Chano Urueta 
 Carlos Nieto 
 Gastón Melo 
 Hilda Moreno 
 Carlos Romano 
 Aurora Clavel 
 Alicia del Lago 
 León Singer 
 Juan Andres 
 Aurora Muñoz 
 Cecilia Camacho 
 Pepe Gonzales 
 Arturo Hernandez 
 Titos Vandis as Dr. Fernandez

See also
 List of American films of 1974

References

Bibliography 
 Roberts, Jerry. Encyclopedia of Television Film Directors. Scarecrow Press, 2009.

External links 
 

1974 films
1974 comedy films
Mexican comedy films
American comedy films
English-language Mexican films
1970s Spanish-language films
Films directed by George Schaefer
Films scored by Alex North
1970s American films
1970s Mexican films